Lloyd Archibald Hales (27 June 1921 – 12 September 1984) was an English cricketer. Hales was a right-handed batsman who bowled both right-arm medium pace and right-arm off break.  He was born at Leicester, Leicestershire.

Hales made two first-class appearances for Leicestershire in the 1947 County Championship against Northamptonshire and Warwickshire.  In his two first-class appearances, Hales scored a total of 76 runs at an average of 19.00, with his only innings of note, a score of 62, coming against Warwickshire.  With the ball, he bowled a total of ten wicketless overs.

He died at the city of his birth on 12 September 1984.

References

External links
Lloyd Hales at ESPNcricinfo
Lloyd Hales at CricketArchive

1921 births
1984 deaths
Cricketers from Leicester
English cricketers
Leicestershire cricketers